Don W. East (December 26, 1944 – October 22, 2012) was an American politician who served in the North Carolina Senate from 1995 to 2001 and from 2005 until his death in 2012.

He died on October 22, 2012, in Winston-Salem, North Carolina at age 67.

References

|-

1944 births
2012 deaths
Republican Party North Carolina state senators
People from Surry County, North Carolina